Raï is a 1995 French film directed by Thomas Gilou. It won the Golden Leopard at the 1995 Locarno International Film Festival.

Plot
Djamel (Mustapha Benstiti) tries to escape the spiral of drugs and delinquency which crushes all his friends in the suburban city where he lives. He works at the municipal swimming pool and wants to start a family with Sahlia (Tabatha Cash), the sister of his friend Mezz (Micky El Mazroui), who wants to break all ties with his culture of origin.

Cast
 Tabatha Cash : Sahlia
 Mustapha Benstiti : Djamel
 Samy Naceri : Nordine
 Micky El Mazroui : Mezz
 Tara Römer : Laurent
 Faisal Attia : Aziz
 Léa Drucker : Girl at the party
 Édouard Baer

Reception
It won the Golden Leopard at the 1995 Locarno International Film Festival.

References

External links
 

French drama films
Golden Leopard winners
1990s French films